Sébastien Barras (1653–1703) was a French painter and engraver.

Life
Barras was born at Aix-en-Provence, in 1653. He was a pupil of Boyer d'Aguilles, and studied for some time in Rome.  The first edition of the Boyer d'Aguilles Collection, published in 1709, contained 27  mezzotints by Barras, which were replaced  by plates engraved by Jacobus Coelemans in the second edition. He also engraved a portrait of Lazarus Maharkysus, a physician of Antwerp, after Anthony van Dyck.

He died at Aix in 1703.

References

Sources
 

1653 births
1703 deaths
Artists from Aix-en-Provence
17th-century French engravers
17th-century French painters
French male painters
18th-century French painters
18th-century French male artists